Alla Sheffer  is a Canadian researcher in computer graphics, geometric modeling, geometry processing, and mesh generation, particularly known for her research on mesh parameterization and angle-based flattening. She is currently a professor of computer science at the University of British Columbia.

Education and career
Sheffer was educated at the Hebrew University of Jerusalem, earning a bachelor's degree in mathematics and computer science in 1991, a master's degree in computer science in 1995, and a Ph.D. in computer science in 1999. Her dissertation, Geometric Modeling and Applied Computational Geometry, was supervised by Michel Bercovier.

After postdoctoral research at the University of Illinois at Urbana–Champaign, she became an assistant professor at the Technion – Israel Institute of Technology in 2001. She moved to the University of British Columbia in 2003, and became a full professor there in 2013.

Recognition
The Canadian Human–Computer Communications Society gave Sheffer their Achievement Award in 2018, "for her numerous highly impactful contributions to the field of computer graphics research".

In 2020, Sheffer was elected as a Fellow of the Royal Society of Canadaand a member of the ACM SIGGRAPH Academy. In 2021, she was elected as a Fellow of IEEE. She was named a 2021 ACM Fellow "for contributions to geometry processing, mesh parameterization, and perception-driven shape analysis and modeling".

References

External links
Home page

Year of birth missing (living people)
Living people
Canadian computer scientists
Canadian women computer scientists
Israeli computer scientists
Israeli women computer scientists
Researchers in geometric algorithms
Hebrew University of Jerusalem alumni
Academic staff of Technion – Israel Institute of Technology
Academic staff of the University of British Columbia
Fellows of the Royal Society of Canada
Fellows of the Association for Computing Machinery